Palm Beach is a 1980 Australian drama film directed by Albie Thoms. The stories involving surfing and drugs are followed in Sydney during two days. Thoms was nominated for an AFI award for Best Original Screenplay for the film.

Thoms had made a large number of experimental films but this was his first traditional feature.

Cast
Kenneth Brown as Joe Ryan
Nat Young as Nick Naylor
Amanda Berry as Leilani Adams
Bryan Brown as Paul Kite
Julie McGregor as Kate O'Brien
John Flaus as Larry Kent
Bronwyn Steven-Jones as Wendy Naylor
David Lourie as Zane Green
Peter Wright as Rupert Robert

References

External links

Palm Beach at Oz Movies

1980 films
Australian sports drama films
1980s sports drama films
1980 drama films
1980s English-language films
1980s Australian films